Esbjerg Power Station is a coal-fired power station at Esbjerg, Denmark.  The power station has a generation capacity of 378 MW.  It is operated by Ørsted.  Its chimney is with a height of  the tallest chimney in Scandinavia. In 2004 a facility for removing NOx was added to the plant.

Esbjerg Power Station produces 2,405 GWh and 2,559 TJ heat per year and has approximately 100 employees.

See also 

 List of power stations in Denmark

External links 
 http://www.energymap.dk/Profiles/DONG-Energy/Cases/Esbjerg-Power-Plant

Energy infrastructure completed in 1992
Coal-fired power stations in Denmark
Cogeneration power stations in Denmark
Ørsted (company)